Flip and Flop is an isometric platform game for the Atari 8-bit family designed by Jim Nangano and published in 1983 by First Star Software. Statesoft released a Commodore 64 port the following year. The Commodore 64 box cover, which features a photo of acrobats that does not relate to the game itself, changes the name to Flip & Flop; it remains Flip and Flop on the title screen.

Gameplay 

The isometric, scrolling playfield consists platforms connected by ladders. Players alternately control Flip, a kangaroo who jumps around on the platforms, and Mitch, an ape who hangs under the platforms. Flip is chased by a zookeeper and Mitch is chased by a net, both of which are lured by sticky squares that delay them for several seconds. The player loses a life for being caught or falling off the playfield. The goal is to flip over all of the marked squares by moving over them. Every five levels there is a short sequence with a small circus presentation.

Levels become progressively more complicated. In Level 13, the maximum playing field size is reached. Later. marked squares must be uncovered twice and there may not be sticky fields to slow the zookeeper or the net.

Reception 
In 1984, German magazine 64'er stated that it was the best example of the genre.

Legacy 
Clown-O-Mania (1989) is an extended clone for the Amiga and Atari ST.

References

External links
Flip and Flop at Atari Mania

1983 video games
Atari 8-bit family games
Commodore 64 games
First Star Software games
Multiplayer and single-player video games
Platform games
Video games developed in the United States
Video games with isometric graphics